The Birthday is a 2004 film directed by Eugenio Mira which stars Corey Feldman alongside Jack Taylor and Erica Prior. It features comedy, thriller, horror, and fantasy elements.

Plot 
Set in 1987, the plot follows Norman Forrester, a guy who attends the birthday of his girlfriend's father, involving himself into a conspiracy pertaining doomsday cults.

Cast

Production 
The screenplay was penned by Mikel Alvariño alongside Eugenio Mira. Mira also scored the film. Shooting locations included Terrassa.

Release 
The film premiered in the official selection of the 2004 Sitges Film Festival. Its festival run also included screenings at CineMuerte Film Festival, Fantasia International Film Festival, and Fantastic Fest. It was released theatrically in Spain on 10 November 2006. In 2021, Filmin acquired streaming rights to the film. In 2023, Jordan Peele programmed screenings of The Birthday at Film at Lincoln Center.

See also 
 List of Spanish films of 2006

References

External links 
 The Birthday at ICAA's Catálogo de Cinespañol

2000s Spanish films
2000s English-language films
Films shot in the province of Barcelona
Spanish comedy horror films
Spanish horror thriller films
Spanish fantasy films
Spanish black comedy films
Spanish comedy thriller films
Films set in 1987